Nothocalais cuspidata, the prairie false dandelion, is a herbaceous perennial with yellow flowers and long slender leaves, native to the Great Plains.

References

External links
 
 
 
 

cuspidata
Flora of the Great Plains (North America)